The 2009–10 OB I bajnokság season was the 73rd season of the OB I bajnokság, the top level of ice hockey in Hungary. Six teams participated in the league, and SAPA Fehervar AV 19 won the championship.

First round

Second round

Playoffs

Semifinals
Dunaujvarosi Acelbikak - Budapest Stars 3-2 on series
SAPA Fehervar AV 19 - Ferencvarosi TC 3-0 on series

Final
SAPA Fehervar AV 19 - Dunaujvarosi Acelbikak 4-0 on series

3rd place
Budapest Stars - Ferencvarosi TC 3-1 on series

OB I bajnoksag seasons
Hun
OB